Loïc Akono (born 6 January 1987) is a Congolese professional basketball player who currently plays for SOM Boulonnais of the LNB Pro B.

Akono has been a member of the Congo national basketball team. He has been working with Jeep Elite and Pro B for 14 seasons.

References

1987 births
Living people
Republic of the Congo men's basketball players
BCM Gravelines players
French men's basketball players
Nanterre 92 players
Sportspeople from Lille
Point guards
Fos Provence Basket players
Orléans Loiret Basket players
French sportspeople of Republic of the Congo descent